Andrea Angelo Offredi (born 17 February 1988) is an Italian footballer.

Biography
Born in Treviglio, the Province of Bergamo, Offredi started his career with AlbinoLeffe. In 2007–08 season, he was offered no.17 shirt of the first team. in January 2008, he left Primavera under-20 team of AlbinoLeffe and joined Serie D side Merate. In 2008–09 season, he changed to no.88 shirt and was the 4th keeper behind Antonio Narciso, Achille Coser and Saulo. He made his Serie B debut on 30 May 2009, the last round of the league, replaced Coser at half–time. AlbinoLeffe lead 1-0 at half–time but eventually lost to Ancona 3–4.

At the start of 2009–10 season, AlbinoLeffe either released or loaned all the keepers, and signed 4 new keeper to replace them (including Daniel Offredi, which A.Offredi moved to Lega Pro 2nd Divisione side Prato along with Alessandro Salvi. 

Offredi received a call-up from Italy under-21 Serie B representative team along with Nicola Madonna on 4 October 2007, which they attended the training camp.

References

External links
 AlbinoLeffe Profile 
 Football.it Profile 

1988 births
Living people
People from Treviglio
Italian footballers
Serie B players
U.C. AlbinoLeffe players
A.C. Prato players
Association football goalkeepers
Sportspeople from the Province of Bergamo
Footballers from Lombardy